Mahmoud Khordbin (born 24 September 1948 in Tehran, Iran) is an Iranian retired football player. He was team manager of Persepolis from 1980 until 2017. He is currently club's deputy chairman.

Club career

Khordbin spent his entire career at Persepolis. He was member of Persepolis from 1964 to 1980. He also was an auxiliary player for Taj in 1970 Asian Champion Club Tournament.

International career
He has two national caps for Team melli.

After retirement

Management
He managed Persepolis F.C. for 7 games in 1993.

Directorship
After he retired, he became director of Persepolis football team. He was replaced by Ebrahim Ashtiani in 2003–2004. Khordbin Returned to his job a season later. After being replaced by Mohsen Eskandarin in 2006–2007, He was returned to Persepolis as director another time by the club in 2007–08 season and then was selected as club's vice president. On 13 September 2014, he returned to Persepolis, again as team manager.

References

1948 births
Living people
Sportspeople from Tehran
Iranian footballers
Persepolis F.C. players
Esteghlal F.C. players
Iran international footballers
Persepolis F.C. non-playing staff
Persepolis F.C. managers
Olympic footballers of Iran
Footballers at the 1972 Summer Olympics
Association football forwards
Iranian football managers